The fencing competitions at the 2024 Summer Olympics in Paris are scheduled to run from 27 July to 4 August at the Grand Palais strip. A total of 212 fencers, with an equal distribution between men and women, will compete across twelve medal events at the Games. For the second straight time, Paris 2024 will witness both men and women fence against each other in the individual and team events held in all three weapons (foil, épée, and sabre).

Qualification

212 fencing quota places, with an equal distribution between men and women, are available for Paris 2024, similar to the Tokyo 2020 roster size. Qualified NOCs can enter a maximum of eighteen fencers (nine per gender), with each consisting of a trio, whether men's or women's, across all weapon-based team events (foil, épée, and sabre). 

About two-thirds of the total quota will be attributed to the world's top fencers based on the points accrued in the Fédération Internationale d'Escrime (FIE) Official Ranking between April 3, 2023 and April 1, 2024, with further individual places available at each of the four zonal qualifying tournaments (Africa, Asia & Oceania, Europe, and the Americas). 

The team events will offer eight to nine spots for all registered NOCs competing in each weapon. Each team must be composed of three fencers (or a fencing trio). The top four teams in each weapon will qualify directly for the Games, with the next set of places assigned to the highest-ranked nation from each of the continental zones (Africa, Asia & Oceania, Europe, and the Americas) between fifth and sixteenth position. If a zone does not field any teams within the specific ranking (from fifth to sixteenth place), the top-ranked team eligible for qualification will secure a spot irrespective of the continent.

For the individual events, quota places vary from a minimum of 34 to a maximum of 37. With the team members directly entered into their respective individual competitions, six more places will be awarded to the eligible fencers based on the FIE Adjusted Official Ranking list by the continental zone of April 1, 2024:  the top two fencers each from Europe and Asia & Oceania; and the highest-ranked fencer each from the Americas and Africa. The zonal qualifying tournaments will offer four available spots with one each to the NOCs without a qualified fencer, male or female, in one or more weapons by the two previous pathways.

Host nation France reserves six quota places to be distributed between the team and individual events, respecting the eighteen-member NOC limit and the 37-fencer limit for each weapon-based individual event. Two further spots are entitled to the eligible NOCs interested to have their fencers compete in Paris 2024 under the Universality rules.

Competition schedule

Medal summary

Medal table

Men's events

Women's events

See also
Fencing at the 2022 Asian Games
Fencing at the 2023 Pan American Games

References

External links

 
2024
2024 Summer Olympics events
International fencing competitions hosted by France
2024 in fencing